Mepok or Mei Poke is a village and village tract in Hkamti Township in Hkamti District in the Sagaing Region of northwestern Burma. At the time of the 2014 census the village tract had a population of 255 people.

History
In the early 20th century the British established a small rubber plantation with hevea trees at Mepok. It didn't prove to be successful.

Geography
The village tract borders Heinsun to the north, Lin Hpar to the southeast and Saung Lin to the northwest. The village of Laung Tauk lies within the village tract of Mepok further in land from the Chindwin, towards the village of Sein Lae in Saung Lin.

Demographics
At the time of the 2014 census the village tract had a population of 255 people of which 140 were men and 115 were women. 55 households were recorded.

References

External links
Maplandia World Gazetteer

Populated places in Hkamti District
Village tracts of Hkamti Township